The Honey Tour is an international concert tour by Swedish singer Robyn, which supports her eighth studio album Honey (2018). The tour started on February 5, 2019, in Stavanger, Norway and concluded on October 15, 2019, in Irving, United States. It is the singer's first headlining tour since the Body Talk Tour (2010–11).

Background 
After releasing her seventh studio album in 2010, titled Body Talk, Robyn went on a hiatus. She released two collaborative EPs, Do It Again with Röyksopp in 2014 and Love Is Free with La Bagatelle Magique in 2015. Robyn then went on to release her eighth studio album Honey on October 26, 2018. The Honey Tour was announced on November 13, 2018.
The tour is the singer's first headlining concert tour since the Body Talk Tour in 2010 and 2011, though she went on tour in 2014 to promote the Do It Again EP with Röyksopp.

Set list 
This set list is from the February 5, 2019, concert in Stavanger. It is not intended to represent all concerts for the tour.

 "Send to Robin Immediately"
 "Honey"
 "Indestructible"
 "Hang with Me"
 "Beach2k20"
 "Ever Again"
 "Be Mine!"
 "Because It's in the Music"
 "Between the Lines"
 "Love Is Free"
 "Don't Fucking Tell Me What to Do"
 "Dancing on My Own"
 "Missing U"
 "Call Your Girlfriend"
Encore I
 "Human Being"
 "With Every Heartbeat"
 "Who Do You Love?"
Encore II
 "Stars 4-Ever"

Tour dates

Cancelled shows

References

2019 concert tours
2020 concert tours
Robyn concert tours